Kallnach railway station is a railway station in the municipality of Kallnach, in the Swiss canton of Bern. It is an intermediate stop on the standard gauge Palézieux–Lyss railway line of Swiss Federal Railways.

Services 
The following services stop at Kallnach:

References

External links 
 
 

Railway stations in the canton of Bern
Swiss Federal Railways stations